Sierra Island is a narrow island which is marked by a series of small elevations throughout its length, lying  northwest of Dee Island and north of Greenwich Island in the South Shetland Islands, Antarctica. Surface area .

Named by the 5th Chilean Antarctic Expedition, 1950–51, after Sgt. Victor Sierra, sick-bay attendant of the patrol ship Lientur on the expedition.

See also 
 Composite Antarctic Gazetteer
 List of Antarctic islands south of 60° S
 SCAR
 Territorial claims in Antarctica

References

External links 
Composite Antarctic Gazetteer.

Islands of the South Shetland Islands